Bar-Hadad III (Aram.) (ܒܪ ܚܕܕ) or Ben-Hadad III (Heb.) (בֶּן-הֲדַד) was king of Aram Damascus, the son and successor of Hazael. His succession is mentioned in 2 Kings. He is thought to have ruled from 796 BC to 792 BC, although there are many conflicting opinions among Biblical archaeologists as to the length of his reign.

The archaeological Stele of Zakkur mentions "Bar Hadad, son of Hazael".

See also

 List of biblical figures identified in extra-biblical sources
 List of Syrian monarchs
 Timeline of Syrian history
 Zakkur

References

External links

People from Damascus
792 BC deaths
8th-century BC Kings of Syria
Aramean kings
Year of birth unknown
Ben-Hadad 03